Galib Mehmed Esad Dede, known as Sheikh Galib (1757 – 3 January 1798), was a Turkish divan literature poet and mystic.

Biography 
His real name is Mehmed. He used the pseudonym Es'ad given by his teacher Hodja Neş'et, from whom he learned a lot by participating in literary conversations, until 1784 (Ergun 1932: 7), and then he took the pseudonym Gâlib. He was appointed as the sheik of the Galata Mevlevi Lodge on 9 June 1791. Galib Mehmed Esad Dede died in 1798 and was buried in the tomb in the courtyard.

Bibliography

Poem's 
 Divan (Şiirler)
 Hüsn ü Aşk (Güzellik ve Aşk)
 Şerh-i Cezîre-i Mesnevî
 Es-Sohbetü's-Sâfiyye
 Zübde-i alem

References 

Divan poets from the Ottoman Empire